Kokkari is a village on the island of Samos, Greece, about 10 kilometers from the capital city, Samos (town).

Description

Kokkari is a fishing harbour of Samos Island, which has now developed into a  tourist center. Still, it preserves its old traditional face, with small houses and lanes full of flowers. Kokkari is on a small peninsula full of houses which climbs up to the top of the hill with a small harbour on one side and a superb pebble beach on the other. Surrounded by green mountains and the view out to the sea, it's worth a journey.

Near Kokkari are several villages like Platanakia, Valeodates, Staurinides as well as many others, which are all connected with streets or small paths. Hiking paths lead all around the island. Find many hidden pebble beaches, like Tsamadou (named after the Greek national hero Anastasios Tsamados), Tsambou, Lemonakia close to Kokkari.

External links

Samos Travel Public Guide 
Hotels and Studio Room Information Kokkari Samos Greece 
Tarsanas Beach Kokkari
Armonia bay by Tsamadou beach, Kokkari 

Populated places in Samos